Syrym Abdukhalikov (born 7 August 1987) is a Kazakhstani former professional tennis player.

A native of Almaty, Abdukhalikov represented the Kazakhstan Davis Cup team in 2007 and 2008, featuring in four ties, for singles wins over Yu Xinyuan (China), Weerapat Doakmaiklee (Thailand) and Patrick John Tierro (Philippines). 

After reaching his career high singles ranking of 544 in the world in 2009, he left the tour to study in the United States and played collegiate tennis for Tennessee Tech, debuting for the Golden Eagles in 2011.

Abdukhalikov won four ITF Futures titles, two in singles and two in doubles.

ITF Futures titles

Singles: (2)

Doubles: (2)

See also
List of Kazakhstan Davis Cup team representatives

References

External links
 
 
 

1987 births
Living people
Kazakhstani male tennis players
Sportspeople from Almaty
Tennessee Tech Golden Eagles athletes
College men's tennis players in the United States
21st-century Kazakhstani people